Peter Frederick Way (7 August 1950 – 14 August 2020) was an English hard rock and heavy metal bassist. He was bassist for the rock band UFO from 1968 to 1982; Way rejoined the band briefly in 1988–1989, and full-time from 1991 to 2008. He was also a founding member of Waysted and Fastway and notably played with Michael Schenker Group and Ozzy Osbourne.

Career 
Pete Way grew up in Enfield, London. He started playing bass guitar in bands with friends from high school. He and guitarist Mick Bolton became friends and they and a drummer formed their first serious band, The Boyfriends. After high school, Way left home at 17 and worked at a maritime insurance company and as a civil servant in the Ministry of Defence.

The band eventually added singer Phil Mogg to the line-up and changed the band's name to Hocus Pocus. After the drummer had a nervous breakdown resulting from drug abuse, he was replaced by Andy Parker. They subsequently changed the band's name again, becoming UFO. After two studio albums with original guitarist Bolton, the band recruited the guitar wunderkind Michael Schenker from Scorpions. Later the band signed on guitarist/keyboardist and long-time friend Paul Raymond. Paul 'Tonka' Chapman replaced Schenker in the early 1980s. The group released many albums and singles and had two UK top 40 hits.

Disliking the more commercially accessible direction UFO were taking in the early 1980s, Way jumped ship to form Fastway with former Motörhead guitarist "Fast" Eddie Clarke. Pete was unable to extricate himself from a contract he signed with Chrysalis and stepped down to play bass for Ozzy Osbourne during the Diary of a Madman tour.

In 1982, Way formed the punningly titled Waysted with Fin Muir, Paul Raymond, Frank Noon and Ronnie Kayfield. Their debut album Vices was released in 1982 and reached #78 in the UK chart. The band's third album, Save your Prayers, where Muir was replaced by Tyketto vocalist Danny Vaughn (Daniel T. Himler) was their most successful in America where it reached #185.

After briefly rejoining the band during the 1988–1989 period, Way joined Phil Mogg in the reformed UFO in 1991 and recorded six more albums with the band within the next seventeen years: High Stakes & Dangerous Men (1992), Walk on Water (1995), Covenant (2000), Sharks (2002), You Are Here (2004) and The Monkey Puzzle (2006). Health issues forced him to leave the band once again in 2008.

Later 
Way released two albums under the Damage Control banner, the first album Damage Control was recorded with Robin George, Spike and Chris Slade; the second was recorded as a trio with Robin and Pete sharing lead vocals.

Pete also recorded a guest bass on a Warfare song along with Evo and Fast Eddie Clarke titled "Misanthropy", which will be released in 2021 on Cherry Red Records (this will be the very 1st time Eddie and Pete will have played together commercially)

Guitars 
During UFO's 1970s heyday, he used a Fender Precision bass, which along with his trademark striped trousers largely influenced the stage appearance of Steve Harris.

Way switched to Gibson Thunderbird basses, which are renowned for the hard edged rock tone; however, he recently commented that he has been using an Epiphone Thunderbird as he found it seemed to have a fatter tone. He has also been known to use basses by Ibanez, most notably a pink Ibanez Iceman bass, and the Washburn B-20 for which he was pictured in an advertising campaign. His image was also used in an ad campaign by Artex basses.

Publications 
In 2017, he released his autobiography, with the aid of professional writer Paul Rees, called A Fast Ride Out of Here: Confessions of Rock's Most Dangerous Man.  In 2020, rock photographer Ross Halfin released a 320 page hardback book of his work with Pete Way called: Pete Way: by Ross Halfin.

Personal life and death 
Way died on 14 August 2020, one week after his 70th birthday, following life-threatening injuries he had sustained in an accident two months earlier. Before that, Way had been undergoing treatment for prostate cancer in 2013 and suffering a heart attack in 2016.

He is survived by his wife Jenny, eldest son David, two daughters Zowie and Charlotte and younger brother Neill. Way had been married six times during his life, with four ending in divorces and wife number four, Dr. Joanna Demas-Way, the first doctor to pose for Playboy magazine, died of a multiple drug overdose while he was on tour.

Way died just ten weeks after his former UFO bandmate and guitarist Paul Chapman, and one year after keyboardist Paul Raymond, leaving vocalist Phil Mogg and drummer Andy Parker as the only surviving members of the No Place to Run lineup.

Discography

UFO

Studio 
 UFO 1 (1970) Uncharted
 UFO 2: Flying (1971) Uncharted
 Phenomenon (1974) Uncharted
 Force It (1975) Chart Position 71 (US)
 No Heavy Petting (1976) Chart Position 167 (US)
 Lights Out (1977) Chart Position 51 (UK), 23 (US)
 Obsession (1978) Chart Position 26 (UK), 41 (US)
 No Place to Run (1980) Chart Position 11 (UK), 51 (US)
 The Wild, the Willing and the Innocent (1981) Chart Position 19 (UK), 77 (US)
 Mechanix (1982) Chart Position 8 (UK), 82 (US)
 High Stakes & Dangerous Men (1992) Uncharted
 Walk On Water (1995) Uncharted
 Covenant (2000) Uncharted
 Sharks (2002) Uncharted
 You Are Here (2004) Uncharted
 The Monkey Puzzle (2006)

Live 
 Live (1971) Uncharted
 Live In Atlanta (1974)
 Strangers In The Night (1979) Chart Position 42 (US), 7 (UK)
 Lights Out In Tokyo (1992)
 Live In Japan (1992)
 T.N.T. (1993)
 Heaven's Gate (1995)
 On With The Action (1998)
 Live In Texas (2000)
 Regenerator – Live 1982 (2001)
 Showtime (2005)

Other 
 Space Metal (1976)
 Anthology (1986)
 The Best of the Rest (1988)
 The Essential UFO (1992)
 The Best of UFO: Gold Collection (1996)
 X-Factor: Out There & Back (1997)
 Flying : The Early Years 1970–1973 (2004)
 An Introduction To UFO (2006)
 Warfare Misanthropy (2020)

Waysted 
 Vices (1983)
 Waysted – (EP) (1984)
 The Good the Bad the Waysted (1985)
 Save Your Prayers (1986)
 Wilderness of Mirrors (2000)
 You Won't Get Out Alive (2000)
 Back From The Dead  (2004)
 Organised Chaos (2007)
 The Harsh Reality (2007)

Mogg/Way 
 Edge of the World  (1997)
 Chocolate Box  (1999)

Pete Way 
 Amphetamine  (2000)
 Pete Way Alive In Cleveland (2002)
 Acoustic Animal  (2007)

The Plot 
 The Plot  (2003) (featuring Michael Schenker on guitar).

Michael Schenker 
 Tales of Rock'n'Roll (2006)
 Temple of Rock (2011)

References

External links 
Pete Way official site
Waysted official site
UFO official site
Metal-Rules.com – Heart of Steel: Interviews UFO's Vinnie Moore and Pete Way
Pete Way: "If I'd have put it off another day... it would have been too late"
 

1950 births
2020 deaths
English rock bass guitarists
Male bass guitarists
English heavy metal bass guitarists
20th-century bass guitarists
20th-century British male musicians
21st-century bass guitarists
21st-century British male musicians
People from Enfield, London
UFO (band) members
The Ozzy Osbourne Band members
Fastway (band) members
Michael Schenker Group members
Waysted members